Events in the year 2010 in Chile.

Incumbents
 President: Michelle Bachelet (Socialist) (left office on March 11), Sebastián Piñera (RN) (took office on March 11)

Events

February 

 February 27 – An 8.8 magnitude earthquake (the fifth largest on record at the time) and tsunami strikes central Chile, affecting 80% of the population and leaving 525 people dead.

March 
 March 11 – Center-right businessman Sebastián Piñera is sworn in as President of Chile, after 20 years of center-left rule.

May 
 May 7 – Chile becomes the first country in South America to join the Organisation for Economic Co-operation and Development (OECD).

June 
 June 28 – Chile's national football team advances to the FIFA World Cup knockout stage for the first time in 12 years.

August 
 August 5 – 33 miners are trapped in a mine in northern Chile.

September 
 September 18 – Chile celebrates 200 years of independence.

October 

 October 13 – All 33 miners trapped in a mine in northern Chile 700 meters underground are rescued alive after 69 days in captivity. The day-long event was broadcast live to millions around the world.

December 
 December 8 – A fire breaks out at the San Miguel prison in Santiago, killing 81 inmates, the country's deadliest prison incident.

Births

Deaths

April
April 24 – Paul Schäfer, founder of Colonia Dignidad (b. 1921)

May
May 17 – Arturo Fontaine, former director of El Mercurio and former ambassador to Argentina (b. 1921)

July
July 21 – Luis Corvalán, former senator and secretary general of the Chilean Communist Party (b. 1916)

August
August 25 – Guillermo Blanco, writer (b. 1926)

September
September 28 – Héctor Croxatto, scientist, National Prize in Sciences laureate (b. 1908)

November
November 24 – Sergio Valech, bishop (b. 1927)

References

External links

 
Chile
Years of the 21st century in Chile
2010s in Chile
Chile